Apagomerina faceta is a species of beetle in the family Cerambycidae. It was described by Martins and Galileo in 2007. It is known from French Guiana.

References

faceta
Beetles described in 2007